The 2019–20 Bangladesh Premier League Final was a day/night Twenty20 cricket played between Khulna Tigers Rajshahi Royals on 17 January 2020 at the Sher-e-Bangla National Cricket Stadium, Dhaka to determine the winner of the 2019–20 Bangladesh Premier League, a special edition of professional Twenty20 cricket league in Bangladesh.
Rajshahi Royals won the match by 21 runs as they won their first-ever BPL title.

Route to final

League stage

Note: The points at the end of each group match are listed.
Note: Click on the points to see the summary for the match.

Playoffs

Eliminator

Qualifiers
Qualifier 1

Qualifier 2

Final

Match Officials
 On-field Umpires:  David Millns and  Mahfuzur Rahman
 TV Umpire:  Morshed Ali Khan
 Reserve Umpire:  Moniruzzaman
 Match Referee:  Raqibul Hasan

Background
In the Eliminator Chattogram Challengers defeated Dhaka Platoon by 7 wickets, and reached to Qualifier 2. As a result of this match BPL going to witness a new champion under a new captain.

In the Qualifier 1 top-ranked Khulna Tigers, batting first could only manage a sub-per 158 runs courtesy of Nazmul Hossain Shanto's 78*, in reply Rajshahi Royals, lost five wickets in powerplay and kept losing wickets in the regular interval on the other hand Shoaib Malik who scored 80 runs could not find any support from other ends, while Tiger's Mohammad Amir picking up 6-for, recorded the best bowling figures in BPL history (6/17). In the end, the Royals fell short of 27 runs before being all out in the last ball of their innings and Khulna sealed their spot in the BPL final for the first time.

In the Qualifier 2, Chattogram Challengers, the winner of Eliminator, being asked to bat first by Rajshahi Royals, the loser of the Qualifier 1, could manage a per-total of 164 losing 9 wickets with the help of Chris Gayle's quickfire 60 off 24 balls and two 30+ contributions by Mahmudullah and Asela Gunaratne while no other batsman could manage double-digit runs. In reply, the Royals were again in trouble losing 3 wickets in powerplay and kept losing wickets in regular intervals. At the end of the 15th over they could manage only 89 runs while they still need 76 runs in the last 5 overs. But Andre Russell held his nerves and scored a quickfire 54* runs off 22 balls to bring the win for his team by 2 wickets with 4 balls to spare and Rajshahi sealed their berth in the Final for the second time.

Report

Rajshahi Royals innings
The Khulna Tigers won the toss and sent the Rajshahi Royals to bat first. Opener Afif Hossain got out cheaply but Liton Das along with Irfan Sukkur made a 50+ partnership with the latter scoring 52 off 35 balls.  though two quick wickets of Shoaib Malik and Sukkur did not bother much to the Royals. In the end, Mohammad Nawaz's quickfire 41 off 20 and skipper Andre Russell's 27 off 16 balls gave the Royals a respectable total of 170/4.

Khulna Tigers innings
In reply, Najmul Hossain Shanto got out on the second ball of the innings. Both the openers were dismissed cheaply. Shamsur Rahman and Rilee Rossouw tried to recover from the situation with a 74-run partnership for the third wicket - the former scored 52 off 43 balls. After the fall of Rossouw, the Tigers kept on losing wickets at regular intervals. Tigers skipper Mushfiqur Rahim could only manage 21 off 15 balls before being bowled. Their tail-enders also failed. The Tigers could manage 149 runs losing 8 wickets in their 20 overs resulting in Rajshahi Royals winning by 21 runs.

Summary
Andre Russell, skipper of Rajshahi Royals received the Man of the Match award for his all-round performance as he scored 27 off 16 balls and chipped in with 2 wickets for 32 runs in his 4 overs. "DreRuss" (Russell) also received the Player of the Tournament award for his all-round performances as he gathered 225 runs in 12 innings with an average of 56.25 and picked up 14 wickets in 12 innings as well as leading his side for their maiden BPL title.

References

External links

2019 in Bangladeshi cricket
Bangladesh Premier League Finals
January 2020 sports events in Bangladesh